Charles Cecil James (14 September 1885 – 28 July 1950) was an English first-class cricketer active 1906–21 who played for Nottinghamshire. He was born in New Basford; died in Nottingham.

References

1885 births
1950 deaths
English cricketers
Nottinghamshire cricketers